Yuen Ka Ying (born September 12, 1988) is a retired professional wushu taolu athlete from Hong Kong.

Career

Junior 
Yuen made her international debut at the 2005 Asian Junior Wushu Championships in Singapore where she won a silver medal in nandao and a bronze medal in nangun. She then competed in the 2006 World Junior Wushu Championships in Kuala Lumpur and earned a silver medal in nangun and a bronze medal in nanquan.

Senior 
Yuen had her senior debut at the 2007 World Wushu Championships in China where he won a gold medal in duilian and obtained 6th place in nandao and nangun. She then competed in the 2008 Asian Wushu Championships in Macau where he won a silver medal in nandao. She was then a triple silver medalist in nanquan, nandao, and duilian at the 2009 World Wushu Championships in Toronto.

In 2012, Yuen won a bronze medal in nanquan at the Asian Wushu Championships in Hanoi. The following year, she won silver medals in duilian at the 2013 East Asian Games and the 2013 World Wushu Championships in Kuala Lumpur in addition to a bronze medal in nandao at the world championships. At the 2015 World Wushu Championships, she won a gold medal in duilian and a silver medal in nangun, followed by a silver medal in nanquan and a bronze medal in duilian at the 2016 Taolu World Cup. She then competed in the 2018 Asian Games where she won the bronze medal in women's nanquan. Her last competition was at the 2019 World Wushu Championships where she won the gold medal in duilian.

See also 

 List of Asian Games medalists in wushu

References 

Living people
Wushu practitioners at the 2010 Asian Games
Wushu practitioners at the 2014 Asian Games
Wushu practitioners at the 2018 Asian Games
Asian Games bronze medalists for Hong Kong
Asian Games medalists in wushu
Medalists at the 2018 Asian Games
Hong Kong wushu practitioners
1988 births